Siripuram is an urban commercial center in Visakhapatnam, Andhra Pradesh, India.  Visakhapatnam Metropolitan Region Development Authority administrative office is located here. There are many buildings landmark to this area.

Commerce
There are many offices and outlets situated here. They are
  VMRDA Administrative Building
  WNS Global Services Corporate Office
  VUDA Children Arena
  Gurajada Kalakshetram
  Dutt Island Building
  Akashavani Radio Station
  Government Circuit House

Transport

State-run APS RTC runs city bus services from Dwaraka bus station and various suburbs to this area.

References

Neighbourhoods in Visakhapatnam